Death in Fancy Dress is a 1933 mystery detective novel by the British writer Anthony Gilbert, the pen name of Lucy Beatrice Malleson. It was republished in 2019 by British Library Publishing as part of a series featuring traditional crime novels. It takes the form of a country house mystery, a popular branch of the genre during the era.

Synopsis
A notorious blackmailer is haunting London Society, leading to several suicides. The Home Office's attempt to capture them leads to a fancy dress ball at the country estate Feltham Abbey, where things come to a head when the host Sir Ralph Feltham is found dead in the grounds.

References

Bibliography
 Magill, Frank Northen . Critical Survey of Mystery and Detective Fiction: Authors, Volume 2. Salem Press, 1988.
 Reilly, John M. Twentieth Century Crime & Mystery Writers. Springer, 2015.

1933 British novels
British mystery novels
British crime novels
Novels by Anthony Gilbert
Novels set in England
British detective novels
Collins Crime Club books